Julia Pfrengle (born 10 May 1995) is a German figure skater. She is the 2010 German bronze medalist and 2009 junior national champion. Her win in 2009 was her third consecutive national title, and her first at the junior level. She won the 2007 and 2008 German Novice Championships.

Pfrengle represents the Mannheimer ERC. She is the daughter of figure skaters Claudia Leistner and Stefan Pfrengle.

Programs

Competitive highlights

Detailed results

References 

 German 2008 Novice Ladies Figure Skating Championships
 2007 German Novice Ladies Figure Skating Championships

External links 

 
 Julia Pfrengle at Tracings.net

German female single skaters
1995 births
Living people
Sportspeople from Ludwigshafen